The 1929 Segunda División Grupo A season saw 10 teams participate in the second flight Spanish league. There was no team promoted to Primera División. Celta and Racing de Madrid were relegated to Tercera División.

Stadia and locations

League table

Results

Promotion playoff

External links
LFP website

Segunda División seasons
2
Spain